The Brugse Vrije was a castellany in the county of Flanders, often called in English "the Franc of Bruges". It included the area around Bruges, and was bordered by the North Sea, the Westerschelde and the Yser river. The city of Bruges was separated from the castellany in 1127. Since then the city and the Vrije were considered as separate customary law areas. The Brugse Vrije was a rich agricultural region. It had its own burgrave, who was seated at the Burg, a square in Bruges, and became part of the Four Members of Flanders at the end of the 14th century, together with the three major cities of Ghent, Bruges and Ypres. The Brugse Vrije sat in the meetings of the States of Flanders.

Organisation

The castellany of Bruges was founded at around the year 1000  under the rule of Count Baldwin IV of Flanders (980–1035) as part of the county of Flanders. The head of the castellany was  a burgrave, who represented the Count of Flanders. The burgrave was replaced by a bailiff in the 12th century. The fief was first called the Castellany of Bruges, but later took on the name Brugse Vrije. In Middle Ages it was divided into Amts.

The Manor
The governing body of the Brugse Vrije was located at the Burg, the square in Bruges where both the civil and ecclesiastical administration were located. Initially the Vrije was seated next to the Steen (castle of the count), on the west side of the Burg. In the 15th century, the Vrije moved to the other side, where it took over a portion of the count's former court, the Dukes of Burgundy having moved their residence to the newly built . In 1434–1440 the Vrije added a tribunal to the southern side, facing towards , a canal in Bruges. In 1520–1525, the complex was extended along the row with a new high tribunal, the aldermen's chamber and an entrance-hall. The architect was Jan van de Poele. A gallery with high arches was built on the Burg-side in 1528–1532. In 1606–1607, a chapel was added next to the aldermen's chamber and in 1664–1666 an orphan room, in which records of the castellany's orphans were kept. The still existing façades on the Groenerei side was built at this time. Lastly, the part of the manor that is visible on the Burg, and which was significantly enlarged by the purchase of the Love in 1555, was rebuilt in 1722–1727 in the Neoclassical style after a design by Jan Verkruys.

The now classified as heritage (1938) building still exists in this form and was used from 1795 to 1984 as a courthouse. Now the building on the Burg houses the city archives, with the reading room located in the chapel. Next to the old Court of Justice lies the renaissance hall. Located in this former aldermen's chamber of the old Palace of the Brugse Vrije, is the monumental 16th-century Emperor-Charles-fireplace, made of oak wood, alabaster and marble, designed by Lanceloot Blondeel.

See also
History of Bruges

External links
Bruggemuseum-Brugse Vrije

County of Flanders
History of Flanders
History of Bruges
Buildings and structures in Bruges